The Memphis Pyramid, formerly known as the Great American Pyramid and the Pyramid Arena, is a building located in downtown Memphis, Tennessee, United States, at the banks of the Mississippi River. Built in 1991 as a 20,142-seat arena, the facility was owned and operated jointly by the city of Memphis and Shelby County; Shelby County sold its share to Memphis in April 2009. Its structure plays on the city's namesake in Egypt, known for its ancient pyramids.

The Memphis Pyramid has not been regularly used as a sports or entertainment venue since 2007. In 2015, the Pyramid re-opened as a Bass Pro Shops megastore, which included shopping, a hotel, restaurants, a bowling alley, and an archery range, with an outdoor observation deck adjacent to its apex.

Construction
The Great American Pyramid was first conceived around 1954 by Mark C. Hartz, a Memphis artist. The project originally included three pyramids located on the south bluffs of Memphis overlooking the Mississippi River. The largest of the three would have been scaled at two-thirds the size of the Great Pyramid of Giza near Memphis, Egypt; the flanking structures would have been scaled at two-thirds the size of the main pyramid. The project languished for three decades until Mark's younger son, Memphian Jon Brent Hartz, resurrected the concept. Mark C. Hartz, who was well known for his architectural renderings, rendered a new bronze glass-glazed pyramid. After years of negotiations, the younger Hartz's concept was adopted by entrepreneur John Tigrett as a symbol for the city of Memphis. The groundbreaking ceremony was held on September 15, 1989, and the building was opened on November 9, 1991.

The construction of the building was managed by Sidney Shlenker, part-owner of the Denver Nuggets and several entertainment companies, whom Tigrett had brought to Memphis to develop tourist attractions in the building. Originally, there were plans for a shortwave radio station broadcasting Memphis music, an observation deck with an inclinator along the side of the building, a Hard Rock Cafe, a music museum, a College Football Hall of Fame, and a theme park on Mud Island. However, the plans were scrapped because of a fallout between Tigrett and Shlenker, and the latter's financial difficulties.

Various former uses and events

The Pyramid was the home court of the University of Memphis men's basketball program, and later for the National Basketball Association's Memphis Grizzlies. However, both teams left The Pyramid in November 2004 to move into the newly built FedExForum. It was also home of the Memphis Pharaohs of the Arena Football League.

The arena hosted the 1993 Great Midwest Conference Men's and Women's basketball tournaments, the 1994 and 1997 Southeastern Conference men's basketball tournament, the 1996 and 2000 Conference USA men's basketball tournament, and the 2003 Conference USA women's basketball tournament. It also held the first and second rounds of the NCAA Tournament in 1995, 1997, and 2001. The Grateful Dead played two concerts at the arena on April 1 and 2, 1995.

Singer Mary J. Blige performed at the arena in September 1997 during her Share My World Tour.

The Pyramid was the site in 1999 of the WWF St. Valentine's Day Massacre: In Your House pay-per-view; also in 1999 the rock bands the Rolling Stones and Phish played sold-out concerts. Phish released an audio recording of the concert, entitled "Memphis '99", as a digital download in 2022. 

On June 8, 2002, the Pyramid hosted Lennox Lewis vs. Mike Tyson, one of the biggest professional boxing events in history, which Lewis won by knockout in the eighth round. The following year it hosted Mike Tyson vs. Clifford Etienne, a fight that Tyson won by knockout in the first round.

On August 16, 2002, the arena hosted a concert that commemorated the 25th anniversary of Elvis Presley's death.

From 2002 to 2006, the annual Church of God in Christ international holy convocations were held here.

Bob Seger & The Silver Bullet Band performed what is reputed to be the last concert ever in the Pyramid, on February 3, 2007.

Filmmaker Craig Brewer used the building as a sound stage for his film Black Snake Moan in late 2005.

Troubles and closure
In 2001, the city of Memphis looked to lure either the Vancouver Grizzlies or the Charlotte Hornets to town. While the Pyramid was functional and profitable, it would have required retrofitting in order to be a viable long-term venue for an NBA franchise. A retrofit would also have required taking the arena offline for a year. As a result, the $250 million FedExForum was built as a condition of the Grizzlies' move from Vancouver and opened in 2004. The city of Memphis did spend $7 million on renovations such as improved dressing rooms and new television camera platforms for the Grizzlies' three-year stay in the arena.

While hosting the Grizzlies, the arena lost $200,000 in 2002.

The City of Memphis's contract with the Grizzlies forbade the use of The Pyramid without the team's approval, and, as a result, it went dark. The Memphis city council voted to keep the arena open in 2004. A committee headed by Memphis businessman Scott Ledbetter studied possible uses of the arena in 2005 and considered such uses as converting the arena into a casino, an aquarium, a shopping mall, or an indoor theme park. In November 2006, Congressman-Elect Steve Cohen (D-Tennessee) suggested that he would attempt to open a Mid-American branch of the Smithsonian Institution in the building. However, these plans were never realized. In the end, the Ledbetter committee on the building's future recommended that it be used for destination retail, which would create more jobs and new tax revenues.

Bass Pro Shops and redevelopment

In October 2005, media speculation began to focus on an aquarium or a Bass Pro Shops superstore as the most likely long-term tenants of the arena. In 2008, the city and Bass Pro Shops reached a tentative agreement, short on details, but based on an intent to develop the then-abandoned structure. On June 30, 2010, after 5 years of negotiating, Bass Pro Shops and the City of Memphis signed an agreement for a 55-year lease for a Bass Pro Shops megastore. In addition, the redevelopment plans included revitalizing the Pinch District, which is the neighborhood east of the Pyramid. The city invested $30 million and hired O.T. Marshall Architects to help with the seismic retrofitting of the structure, which was funded by sales tax revenue in the surrounding area. O.T. Marshall and Insight Design Architects was later hired by Bass Pro Shops for its renovations and construction, which led to its opening April 29, 2015. Construction was completed by W.G. Yates & Sons Construction Company.

In addition to the retail store itself, Bass Pro Shops at the Pyramid is home of an archery range, a shooting range, and a laser arcade. The building also includes a Wahlburgher’s Wild and an Uncle Buck's Fishbowl and Grill with a bowling alley and a saltwater aquarium. The tallest freestanding elevator in America takes visitors to the Lookout at the Pyramid at the apex of the building, where people can take in the view on an indoor and outdoor observation deck or dine and drink at the Lookout, which is a restaurant, bar, and aquarium at the top of the building. At the base of the Pyramid is a 100-room hotel, the Big Cypress Lodge. Bass Pro Shops at the Pyramid contains 600,000 gallons of water features and the largest collection of waterfowl and hunting-related equipment in the world.

Over 3 million people visited Bass Pro Shops at the Pyramid in 2015. Due in part to this large success, Bass Pro Shops is considering adding a zip-line and a second hotel to the Pyramid.

Legacy

In 2011, a drawing of The Pyramid — alongside images of iconic structures from Tennessee's three other large cities (the AT&T Building in Nashville, Knoxville's Sunsphere, and the Tennessee Aquarium of Chattanooga) — was incorporated into the standard design of Tennessee's state-issued driver's licenses.

See also
 List of tallest buildings in Memphis

References

External links

 Emporis page

1991 establishments in Tennessee
Basketball venues in Tennessee
Defunct boxing venues in the United States
Defunct indoor arenas in the United States
Former National Basketball Association venues
Event venues established in 1991
Landmarks in Tennessee
Memphis Grizzlies venues
Memphis Tigers basketball venues
Pyramids in the United States
Skyscrapers in Memphis, Tennessee
Sports venues completed in 1991
Sports venues in Memphis, Tennessee
Defunct sports venues in Tennessee
Skyscrapers in Tennessee